Acupuncture is the second studio album by Doldrums, released on February 24, 1997, by Kranky.

Track listing

Personnel 
Adapted from the Acupuncture liner notes.
Doldrums
 Justin Chearno – guitar, recording
 Bill Kellum – bass guitar, recording
 Matt Kellum – drums, recording

Release history

References

External links 
 Acupuncture at Discogs (list of releases)

1997 albums
Doldrums (band) albums
Kranky albums